Ulpha is a civil parish in the Borough of Copeland, Cumbria, England. It contains six listed buildings that are recorded in the National Heritage List for England. Of these, one is listed at Grade II*, the middle of the three grades, and the others are at Grade II, the lowest grade.  The parish is in the Lake District National Park, it contains the settlement of Ulpha and is otherwise sparsely  populated, and consists mainly of moorland and mountain.  The listed buildings stretch along the valley of the River Duddon, and comprise a church, a sundial in the churchyard, two bridges, a farmhouse and barn, and a house.


Key

Buildings

References

Citations

Sources

Lists of listed buildings in Cumbria